Liane Moriarty (born 15 November 1966) is an Australian author. She has written nine novels, including the New York Times best sellers Big Little Lies and Nine Perfect Strangers, which were adapted into television series for HBO and Hulu, respectively.

Early life and education
After leaving school, Moriarty worked in advertising and marketing at a legal publishing company. She then ran her own company for a while before taking work as a freelance advertising copywriter. In 2004, after obtaining a master's degree at Macquarie University in Sydney, her first novel Three Wishes, written as part of the degree, was published. She has since published eight further novels.

Adaptations 
Her novel Big Little Lies was adapted into a television series by HBO, and stars Reese Witherspoon, Nicole Kidman, Shailene Woodley, Laura Dern, Zoë Kravitz, and Alexander Skarsgård. The series premiered on 19 February 2017, with the first season concluding on 2 April 2017. A second season was announced in December 2017. Season two premiered in June 2019.

In September 2013, CBS Films acquired the rights to an earlier Moriarty novel, The Husband's Secret. In May 2017, it was announced that the film will star Blake Lively. In February 2022, it was announced that Kat Coiro would be directing the film for Sony Pictures.

Her novel Nine Perfect Strangers, published November 6, 2018, was adapted into a television series by Hulu, starring and produced by Nicole Kidman.

Personal life
Moriarty lives in Sydney with her husband, Adam, a former farmer from Tasmania. They have two children, George and Anna. She is the older sister of author Jaclyn Moriarty.

Bibliography

Novels
 Three Wishes (2004)
 The Last Anniversary (2005)
 What Alice Forgot (2009)
 The Hypnotist's Love Story (2011)
 The Husband's Secret (2013)
 Big Little Lies (2014)
 Truly Madly Guilty (2016)
 Nine Perfect Strangers (September 2018)
Apples Never Fall (ISBN 9781250220257, September 2021)

Children's books
The Space Brigade series (also known as Nicola Berry: Earthling Ambassador):
 The Petrifying Problem with Princess Petronella (2007)
 The Shocking Trouble on the Planet of Shobble (2009)
The Wicked War on the Planet of Whimsy (2010)

References

External links
 Liane Moriarty's website
 Liane Moriarty's blog
 

21st-century Australian novelists
1966 births
Living people
21st-century Australian women writers
Australian women novelists
Australian children's writers
Australian women children's writers
Writers from Sydney
Macquarie University alumni